Hung Wan-ting (born 21 June 1990) is a Taiwanese weightlifter. She won the silver medal in the women's 69 kg event at the 2018 Asian Games held in Jakarta, Indonesia.

Early life
Hung is a native of Beinan, Taitung, and attended National Taiwan Sport University.

Career 

At the 2013 Summer Universiade in Kazan, Russia, she won the silver medal in the women's 69 kg event. In 2014, she competed in the women's 69 kg event at the 2014 Asian Games held in Incheon, South Korea without winning a medal. She finished in 6th place.

In 2016, she won the silver medal in the women's 69 kg event at the 2016 Asian Weightlifting Championships held in Tashkent, Uzbekistan.

In 2017, she won the bronze medal in the women's 69 kg event at the 2017 Asian Weightlifting Championships held in Ashgabat, Turkmenistan. Later that year, she won the gold medal in the women's 69 kg event at the 2017 Summer Universiade held in Taipei, Taiwan. In that same year, she also competed in the women's 69 kg event at the 2017 World Weightlifting Championships in Anaheim, United States without winning a medal; she finished in sixth place. This became fifth place after Romela Begaj of Albania tested positive for a banned substance.

References

External links 
 

Living people
1990 births
People from Taitung County
Place of birth missing (living people)
Taiwanese female weightlifters
Weightlifters at the 2014 Asian Games
Weightlifters at the 2018 Asian Games
Medalists at the 2018 Asian Games
Asian Games bronze medalists for Chinese Taipei
Asian Games medalists in weightlifting
Universiade medalists in weightlifting
Universiade gold medalists for Chinese Taipei
Medalists at the 2013 Summer Universiade
Medalists at the 2017 Summer Universiade